Isaac Yamma (or Yama) (1940 – January 1990) was a country singer from Central Australia. He was a Pitjantjatjara man who was born by a waterhole near Docker River (Kaltukatjara). He started his musical career as a member of Areyonga Desert Tigers. He later performed with his band the Pitjantjatjara Country Band, a band made up of his sons Hector, Frank, Peter and Paul and his cousin Russell Yamma. His song were mostly sung in Pitjantjatjara. He was also a radio host on CAAMA Radio 8KIN FM.

Discography
Albums
Isaac Yama and the Pitjantjatjara Country Band (1987) – CAAMA
Isaac Yama and the Pitjantjatjara Country Band No.2 (1987) – CAAMA

Compilations
Papal Concert, Alice Springs (1982) – Imparja
Desert Songs 1 (1982) – CAAMA
Desert Songs 2 (1983) – CAAMA
From the Bush (1990) – CAAMA
AIDS: How Could I Know (1989) – CAAMA
25th Anniversary Compilation 2 (2006) – CAAMA

References

External links
 Cassette cover: Isaac Yama and the Pitjantjatjara Country Band No.2, 1987 

1940 births
1990 deaths
Indigenous Australian musicians
Australian songwriters
Musicians from the Northern Territory
20th-century guitarists
20th-century Australian male singers
Australian male guitarists